Rotanak (ឃុំរតនៈ) is a khum (commune) of Battambang District in Battambang Province in north-western Cambodia.

Villages
Rotanak contains eight villages.

References

Communes of Battambang province
Battambang District